Husch or Hüsch is a German surname. Notable people with the surname include:

 Gerhard Hüsch (1901–1984), German singer
 Hanns Dieter Hüsch (1925–2005), German author, cabaret artist, actor, songwriter and radio commentator

German-language surnames